is a retired Japanese marathon runner.

She won the gold medal at the 1993 World Championships in a time of 2:30:03 hours. In addition she won the Tokyo International Women's Marathon in 1995 and 1998 and the Osaka Ladies Marathon in 1993. Her personal best time was 2:26:10, from January 1994 in Osaka. She finished 17th at the 1996 Summer Olympics.

Achievements
All results regarding marathon, unless stated otherwise

External links

1969 births
Living people
People from Kazuno, Akita
Japanese female long-distance runners
Japanese female marathon runners
Athletes (track and field) at the 1996 Summer Olympics
Olympic athletes of Japan
Olympic female marathon runners
Sportspeople from Akita Prefecture
World Athletics Championships medalists
World Athletics Championships winners
20th-century Japanese women
21st-century Japanese women